Christine Bontemps (born 16 July 1969) is a French sports shooter. She competed in the women's 10 metre air rifle event at the 1992 Summer Olympics.

References

1969 births
Living people
French female sport shooters
Olympic shooters of France
Shooters at the 1992 Summer Olympics
People from Remiremont
Sportspeople from Vosges (department)